Les Martyrs d'Égypte is a work by Hippolyte Delehaye, included in Analecta Bollandiana #40. It contains references to several saints, including:

Abadiu of Antinoe
Abāmūn of Tarnūt
Kirdjun.

References

Sources
Holweck, F. G. A Biographical Dictionary of the Saint. St. Louis, MO: B. Herder Book Co. 1924.

Christian hagiography
History of Christianity in Egypt